is a former governor of Yamagata Prefecture. He was first elected in 2005. A native of Yamagata, Yamagata, he joined the Bank of Japan upon graduation from Tokyo University of Foreign Studies in 1981. He also received MIPP in 1989 and MA in 1990 from Paul H. Nitze School of Advanced International Studies at the Johns Hopkins University.He was defeated for reelection in an upset by Mieko Yoshimura an Education Committee member for Yamagata Prefecture.

References

External links 
  

1957 births
Living people
People from Yamagata Prefecture
Johns Hopkins University alumni
Governors of Yamagata Prefecture